Kjetil Steensnæs (born 17 April 1976, in Haugesund, Norway) is a Norwegian musician (handling various string instruments, such as guitar, dobro, pedal steel guitar and banjo) known from a number of collaborations with musicians like Rita Eriksen, Maria Mena, Beady Belle, Morten Harket, Herborg Kråkevik, Sissel Kyrkjebø, Maria Solheim, Thomas Dybdahl, Sigvart Dagsland, Kari Bremnes, Anja Garbarek, Bjørn Eidsvåg, The Cardigans, Torun Eriksen, Unni Wilhelmsen, William Hut and Tom Roger Aadland.

Career 
Steensnæs is a highly demanded musician, and has collaborated with many of the greatest Norwegian artists like Morten Harket, Thomas Dybdahl, Sissel Kyrkjebø, Maria Mena and Bjørn Eidsvåg to mention but a few. His musical roots are based in American rock and folk music, and he has explored bluegrass and related genres in several ensembles, including the trio Darling West.

He alsoruns the record company 'Grand Slam Happy Time' in Oslo.

Discography

The Holstein United Bluegrass Boys 
2007: The Brightest Morning (Grand Slam Happy Time)
2009: Cattle Tracks (Grand Slam Happy Time)

Other collaborations 
2001: Talkin' Talk, with D'Sound
2002: Behind Closed Doors (Kirkelig Kulturverksted), with Maria Solheim
2003: Glittercard, with Torun Eriksen
2003: Såret Fugl
2003: Jake Ziah EP, with Jake Ziah
2004: Vanilla Kiss, with Silje Hrafa
2004: These Days Do You No Justice, with Jake Ziah
2004: Frail (Kirkelig Kulturverksted), with Maria Solheim
2004: Mellow, with Maria Mena
2005: Briefly Shaking (EMI Music, Norway), with Anja Garbarek
2005: On Every Corner, with Kjetil Fredriksen
2005: When Worlds Collide, with Paperboys
2005: Last Days And Nights, with Simone
2005: Mitt Hjerte Alltid Vanker, with Mosaic
2006: Bridges Or Walls, with Jan Groth
2006: Fagert Er Landet, with Solveig Leithaug
2006: This Is Life, with Anette Vedvik
2006: Elisabeth Yndestad EP, with Elisabeth Yndestad
2006: Spesiell, with Bjørn-Peder Johansen
2006: Bedehusland Country – Sanger Fra Bedehusland 8
2007: Sanger Fra T.B. Barratts Salmebok, with Jan Groth
2007: Et Rom I Huset (Kirkelig Kulturverksted), with Sigvart Dagsland
2007: Vengespenn, with Sølvi Helen Hopland
2007: Forandring (Kirkelig Kulturverksted), with Sigvart Dagsland
2008: Great White (Park Grammofon), with Sarah Nebel (Elisabeth Endresen b. 1967)
2008: The Good Or Better Side of Things (Kirkelig Kulturverksted), with Garness
2008: Letter from Egypt (Polydor), with Morten Harket
2008: Cause And Effect (Columbia/Live Nation), Maria Mena
2009: Andagassi, with Ann Mari Andersen
2009: Thank You, with Safari
2009: Sørg Ei For Dager Som Kommer, with Øyslebø Sangsøstre
2009: I Know (Eccentric Music/Universal Music Group), with Tone Damli Aaberge
2009: Too Damn Late, with Kjetil Fredriksen
2009: Deg, with Ole Reinlund
2009: This Gig Almost Got Me Killed, with Ovidiu Cernăuţeanu
2010: Barnas Supershow – Hytta Vår
2010: Til Skogen, with Bergen Mandolinband
2010: Beste Fra Bedehusland
2010: Honestly, with Cecilie Duus
2010: Passage (Jazzland), with Torun Eriksen
2010: Mrs. Robinson's Pantry, with Sigrun and the Kitchen Band
2010: Rett Hjem – Country Gospel, with Martin Alfsen and Reflex
2010: Toner Fra Bedehusland – Salmer Og Sanger I Instrumentalutgaver
2010: Til Deg, with Sissel Kyrkjebø
2010: Seeds of Joy, with Trine Rein
2010: Sigvart Dagslands Bryllups- og Begravelsesorkester (Kirkelig Kulturverksted), with Sigvart Dagsland
2011: Det Du Aldri Sa, with Tom Roger Aadland
2011: Ryktet, with Trang fødsel
2012: Looking-back (Eccentric Music/Sony Music), with Tone Damli Aaberge
2012: Jeg Har Vel Ingen Kjærere (Plush Badger Music), with Anne Gravir Klykken
2012: Fløyel Og Stål, with Tom Roger Aadland
2013: Ikke Gi Deg, Jente! (HK Productions), with Hanne Krogh

References

Eksterne lenker 

Groove.no – Kjetil Steensnæs

Norwegian rock guitarists
Musicians from Haugesund
1976 births
Living people
21st-century Norwegian guitarists